Benedict Vilakazi (born 9 August 1982 in Soweto, Gauteng) is a retired South African football (soccer) player who last played as a midfielder for Botswana Meat Commission in Botswana. He was noted as one of the smallest  professional international footballers during his time (standing at a mere 1.57 m) but made up for this with a strong physical presence.

He was born in Diepkloof, Soweto and is nicknamed "Tso" and "Little Napoleon" due to his leading skills.

Career
Vilakaz played for South Africa at the 2006 African Nations Cup in Egypt. His professional career was rocked by sex scandals with juveniles including being dragged to court on allegation of statutory rape. He was however acquitted of the charge as it was alleged that it was with consent. The complainant has since given birth to his son. He publicly apologised to soccer fans after his acquittal. The sex scandal also prohibited him going through with his move to the Swedish side Djurgården that was supposed to go through right before the scandal hit.

On 27 July 2007, he was transferred to Danish Superliga club Aalborg BK. He was given a 5-year contract. Due to sickness he had not adjusted to the European style of football, and therefore he played only a few games in the Danish league. Vilakazi returned to South Africa July 2008, signing a contract with Pretoria-based Mamelodi Sundowns, where he was also joined by former FC Copenhagen striker Sibusiso Zuma. After not making an impact at Sundowns, Vilakazi was loaned out to Mpumalanga Black Aces for the 2010–11 PSL season. However, Vilakazi had a fallout with Black Aces' management due to missing several training sessions and other disciplinary problems. Consequently, the Sundowns did not renew his contract after its expiration at the end of the 2010–11 season.

Vilakazi had short spells at Black Leopards and in Swaziland with Malanti Chiefs before moving to Botswana Premier League team Notwane FC in July 2013. In November 2013, he terminated his contract with Notwane after not receiving his salary and signing-on fee, and joined Botswana Meat Commission on a one-year contract., Tso remains the highest scorer of all time for Orlando Pirates, with 52 goals.

Tso had a stint as the head coach of Orange Vaal Professionals, a team campaigning in the ABC Motsepe league, the 3rd tier of South African Football.

References

External links
 at Danmarks Radio

1982 births
Living people
Sportspeople from Soweto
Zulu people
South African soccer players
South African expatriate soccer players
South Africa international soccer players
2006 Africa Cup of Nations players
Orlando Pirates F.C. players
AaB Fodbold players
Expatriate men's footballers in Denmark
Danish Superliga players
Association football midfielders
Mpumalanga Black Aces F.C. players
Mamelodi Sundowns F.C. players
Black Leopards F.C. players
Expatriate footballers in Eswatini
South African expatriate sportspeople in Eswatini
Notwane F.C. players
Gilport Lions F.C. players
Expatriate footballers in Botswana
South African expatriate sportspeople in Botswana